Achada Grande may refer to:

 Achada Grande, Mosteiros, a village on the island of Fogo, Cape Verde
 Achada Grande Frente, a neighborhood of Praia, Santiago, Cape Verde
 Achada Grande Tras, a neighborhood of Praia, Santiago, Cape Verde
 Achada Grande, the former name of Achada, a civil parish in Nordeste, São Miguel, Azores
 Achada Grande, a village in São Jorge, Santana, Madeira Islands

See also
 Achada (disambiguation)